Jama Mohamed Ghalib was a Somali writer, former military leader and police chief, and politician from Erigavo, Somaliland.

He was a major general in the army of the Somali Republic, and was later appointed the Police Commissioner of the Somali Democratic Republic. Ghalib also held various ministerial and cabinet positions in the government of Somalia, including Secretary of Interior, Minister of Labor and Social Affairs, Minister of Local Government and Rural Development, Minister of Transportation, and Minister of Interior.

After his retirement from politics, Jama wrote on Somali history. He taught history, political science and public administration at universities in Mogadisho, including City University, Mogadisho.

Books
Somali Phoenix
The Cost of Dictatorship: The Somali Experience
Who is a Terrorist? (First & Second Edition 2002 & 2005, respectively).
Defending History, which was published in 2005.

References

Living people
Ethnic Somali people
Somalian police chiefs
Somalian politicians
Somalian writers
1933 births